Altınordu  is the central district and a second-level municipality in Ordu Province, Turkey. (Altınordu means Golden Horde, a historical empire.)

According to the 2012 Metropolitan Municipalities Law (law no. 6360), all Turkish provinces which have a population of more than 750,000 became metropolitan municipalities and the districts within the metropolitan municipalities became second-level municipalities. The law also created new districts within the provinces in addition to the existing districts. These changes became effective by the local elections in 2014. According to the amendment Law act no 6447, Ordu Province is also included in the list of metropolitan municipalities. On 30 March 2014, Engin Tekintaş (AKP) was elected mayor.

Before the 2014 local elections, Altınordu was also named Ordu. The name Ordu is now reserved for the metropolitan municipality.

Rural area
There will be six towns and 63 villages in the rural area of Altınordu. Now their official status became "neighborhood of Altınordu".

References

Districts of Ordu Province